Plantier is a French topographical surname, which means a person from an area with plants or shrubs, often a vineyard. The name may refer to:

Claude-Henri Plantier (1813–1875), French bishop
Daniel Toscan du Plantier (1941–2003), French film producer
Maurice Plantier (1921–2006), French politician
Phil Plantier (born 1969), American baseball player
Roberto Plantier (born 1979), Mexican actor 
Sophie Toscan du Plantier (1957–1996), French film producer

References

French-language surnames